De Matthäus Missie van Reinbert de Leeuw is a 2016 Dutch Documentary film directed by Cherry Duyns. It documents how conductor Reinbert de Leeuw prepares for a concert of Johann Sebastian Bachs St Matthew Passion in the Nieuwe Kerk in Amsterdam. It was shortlisted by the EYE Film Institute Netherlands as one of the eight films to be selected as the potential Dutch submission for the Academy Award for Best Foreign Language Film at the 90th Academy Awards. However, it was not selected, with Layla M. being chosen as the Dutch entry.

References

External links
 

2016 films
2016 documentary films
Dutch documentary films
2010s Dutch-language films